Pink Collar is a 2006 ABC sitcom that aired only the pilot episode. It stars Alicia Silverstone, Hedy Burress, Charlotte Ross, Matt Malloy, and Ryan Michelle Bathe. Set in an accident insurance agency, Pink Collar talking about the lives of four women as they juggle their ambitions, friendships, and relationships in the work place. Hayden, the show's main character (portrayed by Silverstone), is struggling to get back into the company's good graces after an unmentioned incident that took place years ago.

Alan Poul, David Knoller and Patricia Breen were behind this project.

Plot 
Hayden Flynn is a hard worker who hates office politics. Hayden's career has been defined by one small but lasting workplace fiasco that occurred years ago. Trying to get back into the company's good graces, Hayden must compete with her best friend Claire for a promotion. Claire is the ultimate competitor, and is determined to make VP by the time she's 30—but when she unexpectedly finds out she's pregnant, Claire begins to wonder if a woman has to make a choice between career and motherhood. Both women are under the watchful eye of Eve, the ultimate political machine who isn't afraid to ruffle feathers (or sleep with a coworker) to establish her place in the office hierarchy. Then there's Alix, the newbie who's got everything going for her: beauty, an MBA degree and minority status. As compassion and competition collide, all of these women must deal with the issues that arise when you're working with (and competing with) your friends.

Cast 
Alicia Silverstone: Hayden Flynn
Hedy Burress: Claire
Ryan Michelle Bathe: Alix
Kristin Bauer: Eve
Reggie Austin: Steve P
Matt Malloy: Marcel
Steve Cell: Meeting Executive
Michael Miranda: Doug Woo
Linda Phillips-Palo: Plant Lady
Michael Silva: Lawson (voice)

External links 
 IMDb link

Television films as pilots
Mass media portrayals of the working class
American television films